LIM homeobox transcription factor 1, alpha, also known as LMX1A, is a protein which in humans is encoded by the LMX1A gene.

Function 

Insulin is produced exclusively by the beta cells in the islets of Langerhans in the pancreas. The level and beta-cell specificity of insulin gene expression are regulated by a set of nuclear genes that bind to specific sequences within the promoter of the insulin gene INS and interact with RNA polymerase to activate or repress transcription. LMX1 is a LIM homeobox transcription factor that binds an A/T-rich sequence in the insulin promoter and stimulates transcription of insulin.

Interactions 

LMX1A has been shown to interact with TCF3 and LHX3.

References

Further reading